Carvalho is a parish in Penacova Municipality, Portugal. The population in 2011 was 846, in an area of 30.14 km².

References

Freguesias of Penacova